Bachelor in Paradise Canada is a Canadian reality competition television series, which premiered on October 10, 2021, on Citytv. It is a spin-off of the American reality television shows Bachelor in Paradise, The Bachelor, The Bachelorette, and Canadian reality television shows The Bachelor Canada and The Bachelorette Canada. It was originally hosted by Jesse Jones. Starting with season 2, Sharleen Joynt, who starred on season 18 of The Bachelor, will be hosting.

Production

Development and filming
Rejected contestants from past American and Canadian seasons of The Bachelor and The Bachelorette are isolated together at "Camp Paradise." It also features contestants who have never been featured on any show.

Camp Paradise is filmed at a secluded area off of the lakeside, Camp Wahanowin in Orillia off Lake Couchiching.

Kevin Wendt from The Bachelorette Canada, The Bachelor Winter Games, and Season 5 of Bachelor in Paradise is serving as the bartender.

The show was renewed for a second season, which will premiere in May 2023.

After Paradise
After the show airs, The Bachelor After Show: After Paradise Canada airs. It is hosted by Daryn Jones and Deepa Prashad. Other members of Bachelor Nation or Canadian television members join them each week.

Series overview
<onlyinclude>

Season summary

References

2020s Canadian reality television series
2021 Canadian television series debuts
Citytv original programming